Allan Nicoll MacDonald (25 August 1892 – 18 January 1978) was an Australian politician who served as a Senator for Western Australia from 1935 to 1947. He served as a minister without portfolio in the Lyons and Page Governments.

Early life
MacDonald was born at Lochee, Forfarshire, Scotland and educated at Arbroath High School.  He migrated to Western Australia in 1911 and worked at Collie in a bakery before moving to Perth in 1914, where he was employed as an accountant.  In August 1914, he joined the Australian Imperial Force and served at the Gallipoli Campaign until he was evacuated due to illness.  He spent the rest of the World War I in Egypt and England.  In October 1919, he married Christiana Hildreth and they returned to Perth in 1920.

Political career
MacDonald was involved in raising funds for the Nationalist Party from 1925 and by 1930 was its general secretary in Western Australia. He was elected to the Senate at the 1934 election, representing the United Australia Party, although he took his seat early in March 1935, filling a casual vacancy. He was minister without portfolio assisting the Minister for Commerce from November 1937 to November 1938 and then assisting the Treasurer until April 1939. Due to his support for Billy Hughes for the leadership after the death of Joseph Lyons, MacDonald was left out of Robert Menzies' ministries. He lost his seat at the September 1946 election, with his term finishing in June 1947. He failed to get Liberal Party endorsement for the December 1949 election.

Later years
MacDonald was appointed to the Western Australian Lotteries Commission in 1948, and was its chairman from 1961 to 1965. He died at the Repatriation General Hospital, Nedlands, at the age of 85, survived by his wife, two daughters and three sons. He was the last surviving member of the March–September 1935 and October 1937-July 1938 Senate.

Notes

1892 births
1978 deaths
United Australia Party members of the Parliament of Australia
Members of the Australian Senate for Western Australia
Members of the Australian Senate
Members of the Cabinet of Australia
Australian military personnel of World War I
Scottish emigrants to Australia
People educated at Arbroath High School
Liberal Party of Australia members of the Parliament of Australia
20th-century Australian politicians
People from Lochee
Australian bakers